Rita Fontemanha (born 13 November 1993) is a Portuguese footballer who plays as a defender for Sporting CP and formerly the Portugal national team.

Club career
Prior to her career in football, Fontemanha played tennis. Following a season in which she broke into Boavista's senior team, it was announced, on 6 August 2014, that she would be transferring to Spanish club Atlético Madrid. Following two seasons in Madrid, she joined Sporting CP in Portugal. At Sporting, she played predominantly as a full-back. In June 2018, Fontemanha extended her contract with Sporting, committing herself to the club until 2022.

International career
Fontemanha made her debut for the Portugal national team on 21 September 2015 against Ukraine.

References

1993 births
Living people
Women's association football defenders
Portuguese women's footballers
Portugal women's international footballers
Footballers from Porto
Atlético Madrid Femenino players
Sporting CP (women's football) players
Expatriate women's footballers in Spain
Portuguese expatriate footballers
Portuguese expatriate sportspeople in Spain
Campeonato Nacional de Futebol Feminino players
Boavista F.C. (women) players